"Live For" is a song by Canadian singer the Weeknd from his debut studio album Kiss Land (2013). The song, which features guest vocals from Canadian rapper Drake, was released as the album's fourth single on September 3, 2013.

Background
On July 27, 2013, the Weeknd posted a picture with Drake being in the studio together, dispelling past rumors of them feuding.

Music video
The music video was released on September 11, 2013.

Charts

Release history

References

2013 songs
2013 singles
The Weeknd songs
Drake (musician) songs
Songs written by the Weeknd
Songs written by DaHeala
Songs written by Belly (rapper)
Song recordings produced by the Weeknd
Republic Records singles
XO (record label) singles